Moor Park Golf Club is located in Hertfordshire, England, and is considered by many to be the finest golf club in the county.
It has two eighteen-hole course; the High Course and the West Course, of which the High Course is the more demanding, having hosted its fair share of both professional tournaments and English Golf Union events, including the Carris Trophy every year from 1935 to 1987 and every fourth year subsequently. The West Course is an amalgam of holes from the original West and East Courses, forming two loops of nine holes to the west and north of the clubhouse.

The clubhouse is set within Moor Park Mansion.

The High Course

Course type: Parkland
Architect(s): Harry S. Colt.
Holes: 18
Par: 72
Length: 6903 yards

The club was featured in Sir John Betjeman's BBC TV documentary Metro-land (1973).

Moor Park Golf Club was founded in 1923 and is currently preparing to celebrate its centenary in 2023. The club currently has approximately 1500 members, of whom 1000 are golfers, the remainder being composed of tennis members and social members.
The club is run by a board of directors, all of whom are unpaid club members. The current chairman of the board is Ian Starr. The club also employs a chief executive, currently Amy Yeates, who reports to the board.
A senior member of the club acts as its president for a three-year term. The present holder of the office is John Grossman.

External links
website

Golf clubs and courses in Hertfordshire
1923 establishments in England
Golf clubs and courses designed by Harry Colt